Dyckia schwackeana is a plant species in the genus Dyckia. This species is native to Brazil.

References

schwackeana
Flora of Brazil